Mayo is an English and Spanish surname. Notable people with the surname include:

 Abdul Ghafoor Khan Mayo, provincial minister in Punjab
 Aimee Mayo (born 1971), American songwriter
 Archie Mayo (1891–1968), American movie director and stage actor
 Arthur Mayo (naval officer) (1840–1920), recipient of the Victoria Cross
 Arthur Mayo (politician) (1936–2015), American politician
 Barry Mayo, radio executive
 Bernard Mayo (1921–2000), philosopher
 Bill Mayo, American college football player
 Bob Mayo (1951–2004), American musician
 Brad Mayo (born 1980), American politician
 Charles Mayo (disambiguation)
 Christine Mayo (1884–1963), American silent film actress 
 Danny Mayo (1950–1999), American songwriter
 David Mayo (born 1991), American football player
 Deron Mayo (born 1988), American football player
 Dysin Mayo (born 1996), Canadian ice hockey player
 E. L. Mayo (1904–1979), American poet
 Ed Mayo, Secretary General of Co-operatives UK
 Eddie Mayo (1910–2006), American baseball player
 Edith Mayo (b. 1940), American historian
 Elton Mayo (1880–1949), Australian psychologist and sociologist
 Frank M. Mayo (1839–1896), American actor and comedian
 Frank Mayo (actor) (1889–1963), American silent screen actor
 Frank R. Mayo (1908–1987), polymer chemist, known for Mayo–Lewis equation
 Gabby Mayo (born 1989), American sprinter
 George Mayo (1807–1894), Australian medical practitioner
 Gilmar Mayo (born 1969), Colombian high jumper
 Gypie Mayo John Phillip Cawthra (1951–2013), English guitarist and songwriter
 Helen Mayo (1878–1967), Australian women's health pioneer
 Henry Mayo (cricketer) (1847–1891), English cricketer
 Henry Mayo (minister) (1733–1793), English dissenting minister and tutor
 Henry T. Mayo (1856–1937), American admiral
 Herbert Mayo (1796–1888), British physiologist, anatomist and medical writer
 Herbert Mayo (judge) (1885–1972), South Australian jurist
 Iban Mayo (born 1977), bicycle racer
 Isaac Mayo (1794–1861), United States Navy officer
 Isaac Mayo (Surfman USCG), 19th century junior surfman in the US Life-Saving Service, a predecessor of the Coast Guard
 Isabella Fyvie Mayo (1843–1914), Scottish poet, novelist
 Janet Mayo (1915–1995), South Australian activist for war widows
 Jerod Mayo (born 1986), American football player
 Joaquín Loyo Mayo (1945–2014), Mexican tennis player
 John Mayo (disambiguation)
 Josh Mayo (born 1987), American basketball player
 Katherine Mayo (1867–1940), American writer and journalist
 Lewis Mayo (politician) (1828–1907), American physician, lawyer, and politician
 Lewis Mayo (footballer) (born 2000), Scottish football player
 Lito Mayo (1955–1983), Philippine artist
 Margaret Mayo (playwright) (1882–1951), American playwright and actress
 Margaret Mayo (children's author), (born 1935), English children's literature and folktales writer
 Margaret Mayo (novelist) (born 1936), English romance novelist
 Margarita de Mayo Izarra (1889–1969), Spanish writer
 Matthew P. Mayo, a book author
 O. J. Mayo (born 1987), American basketball player
 Paige Mayo (born 1986), American wrestling personality
 Patrick Mayo (born 1973), South African football player
 Paul Mayo (born 1981), English football player
 Rahn Mayo, American politician
 Ron Mayo (born 1950) American football player
 Richard Mayo (disambiguation)
 Robert Murphy Mayo (1836–1896), American politician from Virginia
 Robert H. Mayo, British aircraft designer of the Short Mayo Composite aircraft
 Sarah Jim Mayo (1858–1918), Washoe basket weaver
 Sardar Tufail Ahmad Khan Mayo (born 1943), Pakistani politician
 Tariq Shabbir Khan Mayo, Pakistani legislator
 Thomas Mayo (physician) (1790–1871), British physician
 Thomas Mayo (gridiron football) (born 1990), American football player
 Simon Mayo (born 1958), disc jockey
 Virginia Mayo (1920–2005), American actress
 Whitman Mayo (1930–2001), American actor
 William Mayo (disambiguation)

See also
 Arthur Mayo-Robson (1853–1933), English surgeon
 Richmond Mayo-Smith (1854–1901), American economist

English-language surnames
Spanish-language surnames